The Fly Synthesis Texan is an Italian ultralight and light-sport aircraft, designed and produced by Fly Synthesis and which has been in production since 1999. The aircraft is supplied as a complete ready-to-fly-aircraft.

Design and development
The aircraft was designed to comply with the Fédération Aéronautique Internationale microlight rules and US light-sport aircraft rules. It features a cantilever low-wing, a two-seats-in-side-by-side configuration enclosed cockpit under a bubble canopy, fixed or retractable tricycle landing gear and a single engine in tractor configuration.

The aircraft is made from carbon fibre. Standard engines available are the  Rotax 912UL, the  Rotax 912ULS and the  Jabiru 2200 four-stroke powerplants.

Operational history

Variants

Texan 600
Known as the Lafayette Texan in the US.
Texan Top Class
Texan Club
Texan RG

Specifications (Texan Top Class)

See also
Similar aircraft
Sunward Aurora

References

External links

1990s Italian ultralight aircraft
Light-sport aircraft
Low-wing aircraft
Single-engined tractor aircraft